John Spiers is an entrepreneur and philanthropist. He founded Bestinvest in 1986 and sold it to 3i Group in 2007.  He is now Chair of EQ Investors, a wealth management company in London and runs The EQ Foundation, a registered charity which has created Giving is Great.

John Spiers was born in Bristol in 1950.  He attended Kingston Grammar School and gained an MA in Engineering in 1972 at Clare College, Cambridge, where he was Captain of Boats and is now an Elizabeth de Clare Fellow. His first employment was as a Student Apprentice at the Atomic Weapons Research Establishment in Aldermaston. From 1975 to 1986 he worked as a stockbroker in the City of London, latterly with W. Greenwell & Co. In 1986 he founded Bestinvest which he sold to 3i in 2007 for in excess of £165m.  At the time of the sale, Bestinvest was one of the fastest growing wealth management companies in the UK with funds of £3.5bn under management and over 50,000 clients.

In 2008 he set up the Spiers Family Foundation which has supported a number of charities with an emphasis on Early Years Intervention (e.g. WAVE Trust), poverty (e.g. Centre for Social Justice) and education (e.g. Sutton Trust, African Prisons Project).

In 2014 he bought the financial planning arm of Truestone and renamed the business as EQ Investors. EQ stands for emotional quotient. As CEO of EQ Investors he expanded the range of its activities and increased staff numbers to over 60. EQ has a dedication to high ethical values and was one of the first UK companies to become a B Corporation. His views are frequently sought by the financial press.

The EQ Foundation was established as a registered charity with an emphasis on supporting charities tackling the lack of social mobility. Spiers is now leading the Giving is Great initiative to improve the availability of data for charity donors and recipients.

Outside of work Spiers has represented England in the World Golf Croquet Championships and is an active participant in historic motorsport, regularly competing in the Silverstone Classic, finishing 3rd in the International Trophy for pre-1966 GT cars in 2018 and 2nd in the Graham Hill Trophy at the 77th Goodwood Members Meeting.

In 2018 Spiers was featured by the London Evening Standard in a wide-ranging article. In 2021 he received a Lifetime Achievement  award from the City of London Wealth Managers Association.

References

Further reading 
London Evening Standard, 9 February 2018, John Spiers shakes up Retirement Finances with EQ investors 
Pioneer Post, 22 May 2017: How boards with ethics can make business better
City A.M., 31 March 2016: John Spiers talks Robo-Advice
Fund Strategy UK, 12 June 2015: Life after Bestinvest
Moneymarketing.co.uk, 12 June 2015
Daily Telegraph, 23 Sept 2015
Citywire – Best & Worst of recent Investment Trust launches
Citywire: John Spiers is back

1950 births
Living people
Alumni of Clare College, Cambridge
People educated at Kingston Grammar School
Businesspeople from Bristol